Diamantomyidae is a family of extinct hystricognath rodents from Africa and Asia.

References

Hystricognath rodents
Prehistoric rodent families
Eocene first appearances
Miocene first appearances